The 2023 Houston Astros season will be the 62nd season for the Houston Astros, a Major League Baseball (MLB) franchise located in Houston, Texas, their 59th as the Astros, 11th in both the American League (AL) and AL West division, and 24th at Minute Maid Park.  They entered the season as defending World Series champions, their second title, as well both the defending AL and AL West champions.

Offseason

November—December 2022 
The Houston Astros finished the 2022 season as World Series champions, their second title overall, and first since 2017.  Their 106 regular-season wins represented the second-highest total in franchise history, to the 2019 club, and the fifth 100-win season in team history.  They clinched their fifth AL West division title, and 13th overall, and fifth league pennant, including four AL pennants.  Further, their entrance into the 2022 American League Championship Series (ALCS) was their sixth consecutive, representing the longest streak for an AL club.  It trailed only the Atlanta Braves, who played eight consecutive National League Championship Series (1991–1998) for most consecutive League Championship Series (LCS) played.

On November 8, 2022, it was announced that manager Dusty Baker would be back for the 2023 season as Astros manager.

On November 11, 2022, it was announced that general manager (GM) James Click would not be returning to the Astros for the 2023 season.  The following day, assistant GM Scott Powers was fired.  Click had hired Powers from the Los Angeles Dodgers' front office in January 2022.  Charles Cook and Bill Firkus were both promoted to assistant GM following the World Series.  While the club operated without an officially-titled GM, club owner Jim Crane became active in the role, including directly negotiating with free agents.  Cook, Firkus, and co-assistant GM Andrew Ball each assumed increased responsibilities.

The Astros signed hitting coach Alex Cintrón to an extension to run through the 2025 season on November 21, 2022.  Having interviewed for the Toronto Blue Jays' bench coach position, the Astros re-signed him before the Blue Jays finalized their decision.

On November 28, 2022, the Astros signed 1st baseman José Abreu to a three-year, $58.5 million contract.

Catcher Jason Castro announced his retirement from playing on December 2, 2022.  The Astros' first-round selection and number 10 overall in the 2008 MLB draft from Stanford University, Castro spent nine of 12 major league seasons in Houston, earning an All-Star selection in 2013 while starring on teams that lost 107, 111, and 92 games during the club's period of rebuilding.  Although injury in 2022 precluded him from playing in the Astros' championship run, he earned his first World Series ring.  Upon retirement, Castro ranked as the Astros' career leader among catchers in home runs (71), and his 717 games at the position ranked third behind Alan Ashby and Brad Ausmus.

On December 21, 2022, the Astros re-signed outfielder Michael Brantley to a 1-year, $12 million contract

January—February 2023 
Former broadcaster Bill Brown and infielder Bill Doran were announced on January 21, 2023, as inductees to the Houston Astros Hall of Fame with an induction ceremony prior to a contest on August 12 versus on the Los Angeles Angels.  The announcement came during the annual Astros FanFest, held at Minute Maid Park.  It was the first Astros FanFest since 2020, prior to the onset of the COVID-19 pandemic, which led to cancellation of the following two annual events.

On January 26, 2023, the Astros named Dana Brown as their next general manager, hiring him from the position as the Atlanta Braves' vice president of scouting.

On February 10, 2023, the Astros announced that they extended pitcher Cristian Javier for 5 years & $64 million.

Transactions

Free agents

Arbitration-phase players
 

Right-hander Cristian Javier agreed to a 5 year contract extension on February 10, 2023, buying out his 3 arbitration years and 2 free agency years.

40-man roster

World Baseball Classic
The following Astros have committed to represent their respective countries at the 2023 World Baseball Classic (WBC):

Spring training
The Astros are tentatively scheduled to play their first Spring Training game on February 25, 2022, versus the New York Mets, and end on March 28 versus the Triple-A affiliate Sugar Land Space Cowboys.  On March 8, the Astros will face a participant in the World Baseball Classic.

 Conn, Devin (RHP)
 Endersby, Jimmy (RHP)
 Hansen, Austin (RHP)
 Melendez, Jaime (RHP)
Also:

Regular season
For the first time, MLB scheduled each team in the league to play every other team in the league during the regular season, resulting in Houston facing National League (NL) teams 46 times, compared to 20 times under prior scheduling.

Houston's Opening Day is scheduled versus the Chicago White Sox on March 30, 2023, at Minute Maid Park, and the season concludes on October 1 versus the Arizona Diamondbacks.

Regular season standings

American League West

American League Wild Card

Game Log

 
|- style="background:#f7e1d7;" 
| 1 || March 30 || White Sox || – || || || — || || – || 
|- style="background:#f7e1d7;" 
| 2 || March 31 || White Sox || – || || || — || || – ||
|- style="background:#f7e1d7;" 
| 3 || April 1 || White Sox || – || || || — || || – ||
|- style="background:#f7e1d7;" 
| 4 || April 2 || White Sox || – || || || — || || – ||
|- style="background:#f7e1d7;" 
| 5 || April 3 || Tigers || – || || || — || || – ||
|- style="background:#f7e1d7;" 
| 6 || April 4 || Tigers || – || || || — || || – ||
|- style="background:#f7e1d7;" 
| 7 || April 5 || Tigers || – || || || — || || – ||
|- style="background: 
| 8 || April 6 || @ Twins || – || || || — || || – ||
|- style="background: 
| 9 || April 8 || @ Twins || – || || || — || || – ||
|- style="background: 
| 10 || April 9 || @ Twins || – || || || — || || – ||
|- style="background: 
| 11 || April 10 || @ Pirates || – || || || — || || – ||
|- style="background: 
| 12 || April 11 || @ Pirates || – || || || — || || – ||
|- style="background: 
| 13 || April 12 || @ Pirates || – || || || — || || – ||
|- style="background:#f7e1d7;"
| 14 || April 14 || Rangers || – || || || — || || – ||
|- style="background:#f7e1d7;"
| 15 || April 15 || Rangers || – || || || — || || – ||
|- style="background:#f7e1d7;"
| 16 || April 16 || Rangers || – || || || — || || – ||
|- style="background:#f7e1d7;"
| 17 || April 17 || Blue Jays || – || || || — || || – ||
|- style="background:#f7e1d7;"
| 18 || April 18 || Blue Jays || – || || || — || || – ||
|- style="background:#f7e1d7;"
| 19 || April 19 || Blue Jays || – || || || — || || – ||
|- style="background: 
| 20 || April 21 || @ Braves || – || || || — || || – ||
|- style="background: 
| 21 || April 22 || @ Braves || – || || || — || || – ||
|- style="background: 
| 22 || April 23 || @ Braves || – || || || — || || – ||
|- style="background: 
| 23 || April 24 || @ Rays || – || || || — || || – ||
|- style="background: 
| 24 || April 25 || @ Rays || – || || || — || || – ||
|- style="background: 
| 25 || April 26 || @ Rays || – || || || — || || – ||
|- style="background:#f7e1d7;" 
| 26 || April 28 || Phillies || – || || || — || || – ||
|- style="background:#f7e1d7;" 
| 27 || April 29 || Phillies || – || || || — || || – ||
|- style="background:#f7e1d7;" 
| 28 || April 30 || Phillies || – || || || — || || – ||
|- 

 
|- style="background:#f7e1d7;"
| 29 || May 1 || Giants || – || || || — || || – ||
|- style="background:#f7e1d7;"
| 30 || May 2 || Giants || – || || || — || || – ||
|- style="background:#f7e1d7;"
| 31 || May 3 || Giants || – || || || — || || – ||
|- style="background: 
| 32 || May 5 || @ Mariners || – || || || — || || – ||
|- style="background: 
| 33 || May 6 || @ Mariners || – || || || — || || – ||
|- style="background: 
| 34 || May 7 || @ Mariners || – || || || — || || – ||
|- style="background: 
| 35 || May 8 || @ Angels || – || || || — || || – ||
|- style="background: 
| 36 || May 9 || @ Angels || – || || || — || || – ||
|- style="background: 
| 37 || May 10 || @ Angels || – || || || — || || – ||
|- style="background: 
| 38 || May 12 || @ White Sox || – || || || — || || – ||
|- style="background: 
| 39 || May 13 || @ White Sox || – || || || — || || – ||
|- style="background: 
| 40 || May 14 || @ White Sox || – || || || — || || – ||
|- style="background:#f7e1d7;" 
| 41 || May 15 || Cubs || – || || || — || || – ||
|- style="background:#f7e1d7;" 
| 42 || May 16 || Cubs || – || || || — || || – ||
|- style="background:#f7e1d7;" 
| 43 || May 17 || Cubs || – || || || — || || – ||
|- style="background:#f7e1d7;"
| 44 || May 19 || Athletics || – || || || — || || – ||
|- style="background:#f7e1d7;"
| 45 || May 20 || Athletics || – || || || — || || – ||
|- style="background:#f7e1d7;"
| 46 || May 21 || Athletics || – || || || — || || – ||
|- style="background: 
| 47 || May 22 || @ Brewers || – || || || — || || – ||
|- style="background: 
| 48 || May 23 || @ Brewers || – || || || — || || – ||
|- style="background: 
| 49 || May 24 || @ Brewers || – || || || — || || – ||
|- style="background: 
| 50 || May 26 || @ Athletics || – || || || — || || – ||
|- style="background: 
| 51 || May 27 || @ Athletics || – || || || — || || – ||
|- style="background: 
| 52 || May 28 || @ Athletics || – || || || — || || – ||
|- style="background:#f7e1d7;"
| 53 || May 29 || Twins || – || || || — || || – ||
|- style="background:#f7e1d7;"
| 54 || May 30 || Twins || – || || || — || || – ||
|- style="background:#f7e1d7;"
| 55 || May 31 || Twins || – || || || — || || – ||
|- 

|- style="background:#f7e1d7;"
| 56 || June 1 || Angels || – || || || — || || – ||
|- style="background:#f7e1d7;"
| 57 || June 2 || Angels || – || || || — || || – ||
|- style="background:#f7e1d7;"
| 58 || June 3 || Angels || – || || || — || || – ||
|- style="background:#f7e1d7;"
| 59 || June 4 || Angels || – || || || — || || – ||
|- style="background: 
| 60 || June 5 || @ Blue Jays || – || || || — || || – ||
|- style="background: 
| 61 || June 6 || @ Blue Jays || – || || || — || || – ||
|- style="background: 
| 62 || June 7 || @ Blue Jays || – || || || — || || – ||
|- style="background: 
| 63 || June 8 || @ Blue Jays || – || || || — || || – ||
|- style="background: 
| 64 || June 9 || @ Guardians || – || || || — || || – ||
|- style="background: 
| 65 || June 10 || @ Guardians || – || || || — || || – ||
|- style="background: 
| 66 || June 11 || @ Guardians || – || || || — || || – ||
|- style="background:#f7e1d7;" 
| 67 || June 13 || Nationals || – || || || — || || – ||
|- style="background:#f7e1d7;" 
| 68 || June 14 || Nationals || – || || || — || || – ||
|- style="background:#f7e1d7;" 
| 69 || June 15 || Nationals || – || || || — || || – ||
|- style="background:#f7e1d7;"
| 70 || June 16 || Reds || – || || || — || || – ||
|- style="background:#f7e1d7;"
| 71 || June 17 || Reds || – || || || — || || – ||
|- style="background:#f7e1d7;"
| 72 || June 18 || Reds || – || || || — || || – ||
|- style="background:#f7e1d7;"
| 73 || June 19 || Mets || – || || || — || || – ||
|- style="background:#f7e1d7;"
| 74 || June 20 || Mets || – || || || — || || – ||
|- style="background:#f7e1d7;"
| 75 || June 21 || Mets || – || || || — || || – ||
|- style="background: 
| 76 || June 23 || @ Dodgers || – || || || — || || – ||
|- style="background: 
| 77 || June 24 || @ Dodgers || – || || || — || || – ||
|- style="background: 
| 78 || June 25 || @ Dodgers || – || || || — || || – ||
|- style="background: 
| 79 || June 27 || @ Cardinals || – || || || — || || – ||
|- style="background: 
| 80 || June 28 || @ Cardinals || – || || || — || || – ||
|- style="background: 
| 81 || June 29 || @ Cardinals || – || || || — || || – ||
|- style="background: 
| 82 || June 30 || @ Rangers || – || || || — || || – ||
|- 

|- style="background: 
| 83 || July 1 || @ Rangers || – || || || — || || – ||
|- style="background: 
| 84 || July 2 || @ Rangers || – || || || — || || – ||
|- style="background: 
| 85 || July 3 || @ Rangers || – || || || — || || – ||
|- style="background:#f7e1d7;"
| 86 || July 4 || Rockies || – || || || — || || – ||
|- style="background:#f7e1d7;"
| 87 || July 5 || Rockies || – || || || — || || – ||
|- style="background:#f7e1d7;"
| 88 || July 6 || Mariners || – || || || — || || – ||
|- style="background:#f7e1d7;"
| 89 || July 7 || Mariners || – || || || — || || – ||
|- style="background:#f7e1d7;"
| 90 || July 8 || Mariners || – || || || — || || – ||
|- style="background:#f7e1d7;"
| 91 || July 9 || Mariners || – || || || — || || – ||
|-style=background:#bff
|colspan="10"|93rd All-Star Game in Seattle, Washington
|- style="background: 
| 92 || July 14 || @ Angels || – || || || — || || – ||
|- style="background: 
| 93 || July 15 || @ Angels || – || || || — || || – ||
|- style="background: 
| 94 || July 16 || @ Angels || – || || || — || || – ||
|- style="background: 
| 95 || July 18 || @ Rockies || – || || || — || || – ||
|- style="background: 
| 96 || July 19 || @ Rockies || – || || || — || || – ||
|- style="background: 
| 97 || July 20 || @ Athletics || – || || || — || || – ||
|- style="background: 
| 98 || July 21 || @ Athletics || – || || || — || || – ||
|- style="background: 
| 99 || July 22 || @ Athletics || – || || || — || || – ||
|- style="background: 
| 100 || July 23 || @ Athletics || – || || || — || || – ||
|- style="background:#f7e1d7;"
| 101 || July 24 || Rangers || – || || || — || || – ||
|- style="background:#f7e1d7;"
| 102 || July 25 || Rangers || – || || || — || || – ||
|- style="background:#f7e1d7;"
| 103 || July 26 || Rangers || – || || || — || || – ||
|- style="background:#f7e1d7;"
| 104 || July 28 || Rays || – || || || — || || – ||
|- style="background:#f7e1d7;"
| 105 || July 29 || Rays || – || || || — || || – ||
|- style="background:#f7e1d7;"
| 106 || July 30 || Rays || – || || || — || || – ||
|- style="background:#f7e1d7;"
| 107 || July 31 || Guardians || – || || || — || || – ||
|- 

|- style="background:#f7e1d7;"
| 108 || August 1 || Guardians || – || || || — || || – ||
|- style="background:#f7e1d7;"
| 109 || August 2 || Guardians || – || || || — || || – ||
|- style="background: 
| 110 || August 3 || @ Yankees || – || || || — || || – ||
|- style="background: 
| 111 || August 4 || @ Yankees || – || || || — || || – ||
|- style="background: 
| 112 || August 5 || @ Yankees || – || || || — || || – ||
|- style="background: 
| 113 || August 6 || @ Yankees || – || || || — || || – ||
|- style="background: 
| 114 || August 8 || @ Orioles || – || || || — || || – ||
|- style="background: 
| 115 || August 9 || @ Orioles || – || || || — || || – ||
|- style="background: 
| 116 || August 10 || @ Orioles || – || || || — || || – ||
|- style="background:#f7e1d7;"
| 117 || August 11 || Angels || – || || || — || || – ||
|- style="background:#f7e1d7;"
| 118 || August 12 || Angels || – || || || — || || – ||
|- style="background:#f7e1d7;"
| 119 || August 13 || Angels || – || || || — || || – ||
|- style="background: 
| 120 || August 14 || @ Marlins || – || || || — || || – ||
|- style="background: 
| 121 || August 15 || @ Marlins || – || || || — || || – ||
|- style="background: 
| 122 || August 16 || @ Marlins || – || || || — || || – ||
|- style="background:#f7e1d7;" 
| 123 || August 18 || Mariners || – || || || — || || – ||
|- style="background:#f7e1d7;"
| 124 || August 19 || Mariners || – || || || — || || – ||
|- style="background:#f7e1d7;"
| 125 || August 20 || Mariners || – || || || — || || – ||
|- style="background:#f7e1d7;"
| 126 || August 21 || Red Sox || – || || || — || || – ||
|- style="background:#f7e1d7;"
| 127 || August 22 || Red Sox || – || || || — || || – ||
|- style="background:#f7e1d7;"
| 128 || August 23 || Red Sox || – || || || — || || – ||
|- style="background:#f7e1d7;"
| 129 || August 24 || Red Sox || – || || || — || || – ||
|- style="background: 
| 130 || August 25 || @ Tigers || – || || || — || || – ||
|- style="background: 
| 131 || August 26 || @ Tigers || – || || || — || || – ||
|- style="background: 
| 132 || August 27 || @ Tigers || – || || || — || || – ||
|- style="background: 
| 133 || August 28 || @ Red Sox || – || || || — || || – ||
|- style="background: 
| 134 || August 29 || @ Red Sox || – || || || — || || – ||
|- style="background: 
| 135 || August 30 || @ Red Sox || – || || || — || || – ||
|- 

|- style="background:#f7e1d7;"
| 136 || September 1 || Yankees || – || || || — || || – ||
|- style="background:#f7e1d7;"
| 137 || September 2 || Yankees || – || || || — || || – ||
|- style="background:#f7e1d7;"
| 138 || September 3 || Yankees || – || || || — || || – ||
|- style="background: 
| 139 || September 4 || @ Rangers || – || || || — || || – ||
|- style="background: 
| 140 || September 5 || @ Rangers || – || || || — || || – ||
|- style="background: 
| 141 || September 6 || @ Rangers || – || || || — || || – ||
|- style="background:#f7e1d7;"
| 142 || September 8 || Padres || – || || || — || || – ||
|- style="background:#f7e1d7;"
| 143 || September 9 || Padres || – || || || — || || – ||
|- style="background:#f7e1d7;"
| 144 || September 10 || Padres || – || || || — || || – ||
|- style="background:#f7e1d7;"
| 145 || September 11 || Athletics || – || || || — || || – ||
|- style="background:#f7e1d7;"
| 146 || September 12 || Athletics || – || || || — || || – ||
|- style="background:#f7e1d7;"
| 147 || September 13 || Athletics || – || || || — || || – ||
|- style="background: 
| 148 || September 15 || @ Royals || – || || || — || || – ||
|- style="background: 
| 149 || September 16 || @ Royals || – || || || — || || – ||
|- style="background: 
| 150 || September 17 || @ Royals || – || || || — || || – ||
|- style="background:#f7e1d7;" 
| 151 || September 18 || Orioles || – || || || — || || – ||
|- style="background:#f7e1d7;"
| 152 || September 19 || Orioles || – || || || — || || – ||
|- style="background:#f7e1d7;"
| 153 || September 20 || Orioles || – || || || — || || – ||
|- style="background:#f7e1d7;"
| 154 || September 22 || Royals || – || || || — || || – ||
|- style="background:#f7e1d7;"
| 155 || September 23 || Royals || – || || || — || || – ||
|- style="background:#f7e1d7;"
| 156 || September 24 || Royals || – || || || — || || – ||
|- style="background: 
| 157 || September 25 || @ Mariners || – || || || — || || – ||
|- style="background: 
| 158 || September 26 || @ Mariners || – || || || — || || – ||
|- style="background: 
| 159 || September 27 || @ Mariners || – || || || — || || – ||
|- style="background: 
| 160 || September 29 || @ Diamondbacks || – || || || — || || – ||
|- style="background: 
| 161 || September 30 || @ Diamondbacks || – || || || — || || – ||
|- style="background: 
| 162 || October 1 || @ Diamondbacks || – || || || — || || – ||
|-

Roster

Minor league system

References

External links
Houston Astros season official site 
2023 Houston Astros season at Baseball Reference

Houston Astros seasons
Houston Astros
Houston Astros